Fowler's Mill  was a horizontal windmill erected at Battersea, Surrey (now in London), England in 1788 and which ceased to work by wind c. 1825.

History

Fowler's Mill was built in the grounds of the partly demolished Bolingbroke House in 1788 by Thomas Fowler to a design of Stephen Hooper. It worked by wind until 1825, when the windmill was dismantled, leaving the substructure, which was used for milling as late as 1882. Initially it was used to produce linseed oil, but was later was used to grind malt for a distillery. The mill was supplemented by a steam engine, and Pitt the Younger is said to have shown great interest in the whole enterprise. The windmill was dismantled in 1825 as the cost of maintenance was too high. The building that the windmill was mounted on continued in use as a steam-powered mill until at least 1882.

Description
There were ninety-six sails (called floats), with the same number of shutters in the mill body which could be opened or closed to allow a flow of air through one half of the diameter of the structure. The mill drove six pairs of millstones.

Millers
Hodgson & Co.
Dives

References

External links

Horizontal Windmills - Battersea windmill is described in this excerpt from the paper by Rex Wailes, published in Transactions of the Newcomen Society,1967–68, Vol 40.

Former windmills in London
Grinding mills in the United Kingdom
Windmills completed in 1788
Former buildings and structures in the London Borough of Wandsworth
1788 establishments in England
Buildings and structures in Battersea